The Electronic System for Trademark Trials and Appeals (ESTTA) is the electronic filing system for legal proceedings at the United States Trademark Trial and Appeal Board. ESTTA provides forms for routine filings like consent motions and requests for an extension of time to oppose a mark. Parties can also upload digital copies of various types of pleadings and motions.

References

External links 
 Electronic System for Trademark Trials and Appeals

United States trademark law
United States Patent and Trademark Office
Government databases in the United States
Online law databases
Legal software
E-government